AFL Capricornia is an amateur Australian rules football competition played across Central Queensland between the months of March to September. Spanning across three main regions of Central Queensland. Including Rockhampton, Gladstone and Livingstone.

Popularity and Participation
Rugby league being the most populous sport in the state, means that Australian rules sees only mild popularity in Central Queensland.

AFL Capricornia is an amateur Australian Rules Football competition played across Central Queensland between the months of March to September, which are typically the cooler months of the Queensland climate. Traditionally the Grand Final is held in Rockhampton at the "Rockhampton Cricket Ground" or occasionally at "Stenlake Park" (last in 2011), however Gladstone has twice held the Grand Final at "Clinton Park" (2004 & 2015).

Brief history
Rockhampton's first football club, the Rockhampton Football Club was formed by Dr. Roberston under Australian Rules in 1873, making it the third city in the colony after Brisbane and Ipswich to take up the sport. Matches were played on the Rockhampton Cricket Reserve. By the 1880s there was a full league running in Capricornia. North Rockhampton Football Club was founded in 1885. However at the turn of the century, rugby football took hold across most of the state and the Australian rules competitions went into recess.

The existing competition commenced as an informal, social competition, and in 1972 the competition expanded with clubs playing in Rockhampton and Gladstone, and later variously Blackwater, Biloela, Boyne Island and Yeppoon. During the mid to late 1980s there were eight clubs in the competition.

Since 1994 there have been six clubs in the competition, with all clubs having their own grounds to train and play on. Every club currently is fielding teams in all nine competitions (A-Grade, Reserves, Women's, Under 17, Under 15, Under 13, Under 11, Under 9, & Under 7). It is the only competition in Queensland outside of Cairns and Brisbane to run a full league that includes seniors to juniors at all six clubs.

Following the 1997 season the neighboring Central Highlands AFL collapsed leaving the then Capricornia AFL as the sole league for Australian Rules Football in Central Queensland. Since 1998 some fans have talked about the possibility of some former Central Highlands AFL clubs joining AFL Capricornia, however neither the leagues (AFL Capricornia or Central Highlands AFL) or any of their associated clubs have officially commented on the possibility that AFL Capricornia might expand West. Today many of the former Central Highlands AFL clubs still continue to operate, even though they are without a league to play-in, and even run Auskick programs.

The region's representative team originally had colours of yellow, black and white, and were known as the "Taipans". During the reconfiguration of AFL Queensland another representative team closer to Brisbane was given the nickname "Taipans", this forced the AFL Capricornia to choose a different identity. The new colours are dark blue, sky blue and white, and are now known as the "Cyclones"

The Capricornia region has had a few success stories of ex-AFL Capricornia players now playing or have played in the AFL, some players include Zac Smith (Suns, Cats), Paul O'Shea (Bulldogs), Gavin Urquart (Kangaroos).

It was one of the first regional leagues in Queensland to introduce a Women's League. Today in Queensland Women's Leagues are also run by AFL Queensland, AFL Cairns, AFL Mackay, AFL Townsville, AFL Queensland Youth Girls Competition.

The first all women's Australian Football game in this region was played in 1983, with Sisters Roos AFC (Brothers) versus Boyne Island Tannum Sands Saints. The game was played before the seniors game, and the eventual winner was the Sisters Roos. Sisters Roos were also holders of the Champions Cup which was given to the winners of the then pre season challenge. There had been talk of a Women's League starting since 1992, though it took much longer to eventuate, but there were a couple of exhibition games played before the men's senior games in the nineties. AFL Capricornia encourages women and girls to participate in AFL and would like to see a women's or girls League start in the near future. Brothers Roos AFC do have a women's team, named 'The Sisters' but do not yet have an opposing club in the area to play against. In late 2010 the AFL Capricornia Women's League was formed. The format for the season is 5 home & away rounds, plus finals, beginning on Sunday, 11 July. Matches take part on either Saturday or Sunday Afternoons. AFL Capricornia development officer Stuart Seager said "The games were of a high quality". The competition came about after Boyne Island Tannum Sands Saints AFC player Megan Hunt approached AFLQ and AFL Capricornia on behalf of women who could no longer play in age competitions against males.

The league is covered primarily by the local print media of Rockhampton's Morning Bulletin and Gladston's The Observer. TV highlights are also broadcast weekly on the local news sport segments of WIN News Rockhampton and Seven News Rockhampton. Weekly radio wrap segments are broadcast on the Saturday morning Local Grandstand segment of ABC Capricornia. Many of these may also include occasional interviews with players, coachers, and even league officials.

Clubs

Current clubs

Former clubs

Auskick clinic locations
Auskick Clinics are run by AFL Capricornia in conjunction with local schools. Some notable clinic locations both past & present include:

League honours

Premiers

Best & Fairest

Leading goal kickers

National league players

Inter-League matches

Seasons
 A Grade Senior Men
Below is a summary of the A Grade Premiership Tables at the end of the home and away fixtures and the Finals results for the most recent seasons of the AFL Capricornia.

1969–2007
To be determined

2008

2009

2010

2011

2012

2013

2014

2015 Ladder

2016 Ladder

2017 Ladder

AFL Capricornia Grand Final results

The First Rockhampton A Grade Australian Football Grand Final

Recent A Grade Grand Final results

Recent Reserve Grade Grand Final results

See also

Australian Rules football in Queensland

References

External links
capricornia.aflq.com.au
bits.aflq.com.au
brothers.aflq.com.au
mudcrabs.aflq.com.au
glenmorebulls.aflq.com.au
rockhamptonpanthers.aflq.com.au
yeppoon.aflq.com.au

Australian rules football competitions in Queensland